Miss Thailand Universe 2010, the 11th Miss Thailand Universe pageantheld at Sofitel Centara Grand Bangkok, in Bangkok, Thailand on March 20, 2010. The contestants will camp in Kamphaeng Phet before flying back to Bangkok for the final stage. Chutima Durongdej, Miss Thailand Universe 2009, will crown her successor at the end of this event.

In the final round, broadcast live on BBTV Channel 7, Fonthip Watcharatrakul, was crowned Miss Thailand Universe 2010 by Chutima Durongdej, Miss Thailand Universe 2009.

In this August, Fonthip Watcharatrakul, representative of Thailand at the Miss Universe 2010 pageant and in this November, Watsaporn Wattanakoon represented Thailand at the Miss Earth 2010.

Results
Color keys

Placements

Special awards

Judges
 Preeya Kullavanich
 Petcharaporn Watcharapol
 Patcha Sila-on - President S&P Public Company Limited Thailand.
 Apasra Hongsakula - Miss Universe 1965
 Panya Vijintanasarn
 Sudarat Burapachaisri
 Nguyen Thi Giang My - Miss Vietnam 1992
 Siam Sangworiboot - Publisher Theater
 Morakot Kittisara - Miss Thailand Universe 2004
 Tawin Yaowapolkul - Actor

Delegates

Withdraws
 #10 - Kanoklada Bootpimpa, ( Bangkok)
 #16 - Yaowaret Sriwongkol, ( Bangkok)

Replaces
 #10 - Pathitta Sira-aporn, ( Bangkok)
 #16 - Chada Sangworavejchaphan, ( Bangkok)

Notes
 #5 Suchada Na Tawan competed in Miss Thailand Universe 2005, but both did not place.
 #6 Punyawee (Saranya) Chamkrai competed in Miss Thailand Universe 2008, but both did not place.
 #11 Ratreechalerm Dejboonyapichat competed in Miss Thailand 2009, where she placed at the Top 10.
 #25 Pornpan Ayuwasri competed in Miss Thailand Universe 2008, but both did not place.
 #41 Nattayanee Rattanapaithun competed in Miss Thailand Universe 2007, but both did not place and Miss Thailand World 2007, where she won Miss Friendship award.

References

External links
 Miss Thailand Universe official website

2010
2010 beauty pageants
2010 in Bangkok
March 2010 events in Thailand
Beauty pageants in Thailand